Marila spiciformis is a species of flowering plant in the Calophyllaceae family. It is found only in Peru.

References

spiciformis
Endemic flora of Peru
Vulnerable plants
Taxonomy articles created by Polbot